Chironomus ochreatus is a species in the family Chironomidae ("midges"), in the order Diptera ("flies").

References

Further reading

External links

Chironomidae
Insects described in 1945